= AngloMockBa =

British-Russian festival

AngloMockBa is an international/British-Russian festival of arts, fashion, film, media, music, ideas, and literature to be held in Moscow from 1–3 May. It is understood to be the second edition of the Jewel of Russia Festival.
